It Started with Eve is a 1941 American musical romantic comedy film directed by Henry Koster and starring Deanna Durbin, Robert Cummings, and Charles Laughton. The film received an Oscar nomination for Best Original Music Score (Charles Previn and Hans J. Salter). The film is considered by some critics to be Durbin's best film, and the last in which she worked with the producer (Joe Pasternak) and director (Henry Koster) who groomed her for stardom. It Started with Eve was remade in 1964 as I'd Rather Be Rich.

Plot
The millionaire Jonathan Reynolds is dying, and his son Johnny returns from Mexico City to his deathbed. The attending physician, Dr. Harvey, informs Johnny that his father does not have much time to live and that his last wish is to get to know Johnny's future wife. Johnny drives quickly to his hotel to find his fiancée, Gloria Pennington, but she has left with her mother. Desperate, he asks Anne Terry if she can play Gloria for an evening. She agrees. She is kind to the dying man and he is pleased with her manner.

To everyone's surprise, the father feels much better than expected the next morning and asks if he can see his son's fiancée once again. Dr. Harvey is still concerned about the health of his patient and asks Johnny to keep pretending that Anne is Gloria. Johnny catches Anne at the train station as she is about to leave for her hometown and convinces her to return with him.

He and Anne arrive home, to find that Gloria and her mother have suddenly appeared there. Johnny tries to explain the situation. At the same time, Anne, who is an aspiring opera singer, learns of the father's New York opera world contacts. She suggests giving a party for the elderly Jonathan to show off her vocal ability. Johnny agrees, but wants to introduce his father to his real fiancée, by telling the father that he and Gloria (Anne) are separated, and his new girlfriend is the real Gloria. Anne asks him to wait until after the party, but Johnny refuses.

The next evening, Johnny informs his father about the separation. At this moment, Anne falls into the room and asks for Johnny's forgiveness. Johnny is almost forced by his father to forgive her. When Jonathan leaves the room, he, however, learns the true story through the ensuing loud dispute between Anne and Johnny. Gloria and her mother are now fully satisfied. Again, they see Johnny with Anne, but, this time, Johnny's mouth is covered by lipstick marks. Deciding that enough is enough, the mother and daughter leave yet again.

At last, the day of the party arrives. Jonathan is back in good health, and Johnny goes to the party with Gloria and her mother, explaining to his father that Anne has a headache and cannot attend. Jonathan then sets off to see Anne. He tells her that he knows the true story, but wants to go out for a farewell dinner between old friends. They go to a nightclub where they drink and dance together. Jonathan secretly sends word to Johnny to come to the club. When Johnny and Dr. Harvey arrive, Johnny accuses Anne of endangering his father's life. Anne flings his drink in his face and leaves.

The next day, Johnny catches Anne once again at the station to tell her that his father has had another heart attack and wants to see her. They rush to the mansion, only to find that Jonathan is fine—it was his doctor who collapsed. Jonathan just took advantage of the mixup to bring the young couple back together. Johnny and Anne recognize their true feelings for each other, which pleases Jonathan.

Cast
 Deanna Durbin as Anne Terry
 Charles Laughton as Jonathan Reynolds
 Robert Cummings as Jonathan 'Johnny' Reynolds Jr.
 Guy Kibbee as Bishop Maxwell
 Margaret Tallichet as Gloria Pennington
 Catherine Doucet as Mrs. Pennington
 Walter Catlett as Doctor Harvey
 Charles Coleman as Roberts
 Leonard Elliott as Reverend Henry Stebbins
 Irving Bacon as Raven 
 Gus Schilling as Raven 
 Wade Boteler as Harry, the Newspaper Editor 
 Dorothea Kent as Jackie Donovan 
 Clara Blandick as Nurse
 Robert Homans as Railway Conductor (uncredited)
 Larry Steers as Party Guest (uncredited)

Production

Development
The film was originally known as Almost an Angel. Joe Pasternak announced he would make Almost an Angel in 1938 as a vehicle for Danielle Darrieux. Ralph Bock and Frederick Kohner wrote a script. Then in 1939 Franciska Gaal was announced as star.

The film was eventually never made - the title was transferred to another project by Pasternak in December 1940 which would become It Started with Eve. Henry Koster was directed and L Fodor and Norman Krasna wrote the script.

In February 1941 Charles Laughton signed on. The following month Deanna Durbin agreed to co-star; plans to put her in Ready to Romance with Charles Boyer were abandoned.

Shooting
Filming started 27 May 1941, just after Durbin returned from honeymoon for her first marriage.

Pasternak announced during filming that he would be leaving Universal after 16 years. He later wrote about it in his memoirs:
I called her into my office and told her why it had to be and why I was leaving. It was the only time in our years together I saw her weep. "You can't," she said. "You can't do this to me." But I had my personal reasons, and they did not all concern her and I said I must. It was not easy to talk to her because a lot of water had flowed under the bridge. She had her life to live now and it could not be the same as before. She said some nice things and ran out of the office.
In October 1941 Koster said this was the toughest film he had ever worked on. He had an argument with Norman Krasna which resulted in Krasna quitting the film with 40 pages still to be written. Richard Carle died after working in the picture for three weeks. He was in every scene and they all had to be shot again with Walter Catlett in the role.  Then Durbin became ill for four weeks; they shot around her for five days then had to stop production. When she came back Laughton fell ill and there was another delay. An electrician fell from a scaffolding on the set and broke a leg and another was burned. Pasternak signed to go to MGM and Koster was getting divorced.

Koster later said he thought Durbin looked at her most beautiful in this film because of Rudolph Mate's photography.

Filming did not finish until September. Cummings had to go work on King's Row during the shoot.

Reception
In his review in The New York Times, Bosley Crowther called the film "light and unpretentious fare" and "should please—as they say—both young and old. It's the perfect '8-to-80' picture." Crowther singled out the performances of Charles Laughton, who plays cupid, and Deanna Durbin. Crowther wrote: 
 
Regarding Durbin's performance, Crowther wrote, "Miss Durbin is as refreshing and pretty as she has ever been and sings three assorted songs—including a Tchaikovsky waltz—with lively charm."

Durbin later said the film "was handed to Charles Laughton. He was marvellous in the picture and the fact that we remained very close friends even though we were both aware of "Eve" being a Laughton not a Durbin film, shows how fond we were of each other."

Awards and nominations
 1942 Academy Award nomination for Best Original Music Score (Charles Previn and Hans J. Salter).

References

External links
 
 
 
 
 It Started with Eve on Lux Radio Theater: November 20, 1944
 It Started with Eve on Stars in the Air: January 31, 1952
 Review of film at Variety

1941 films
1941 musical comedy films
1941 romantic comedy films
American musical comedy films
American romantic comedy films
American romantic musical films
American black-and-white films
1940s English-language films
Films directed by Henry Koster
Universal Pictures films
Films produced by Joe Pasternak
Films scored by Hans J. Salter
1940s American films